Tylopilus humilis is a bolete fungus in the family Boletaceae. It was first described scientifically in 1967 by Harry Delbert Thiers from collections made in Mendocino, California. It is found in the United States.

See also
List of North American boletes

References

External links

humilis
Fungi described in 1967
Fungi of the United States
Fungi without expected TNC conservation status